Ustinka Ust-Kamenogorsk was an ice hockey team in Oskemen, Kazakhstan. They participated in the Kazakhstan Hockey Championship during the 2003–04 season. Ustinka finished in seventh place in the regular season.

References

External links
Ustinka Ust-Kamenogorsk on EuroHockey.com

Defunct ice hockey teams in Kazakhstan